Daniel Jillings (born 2 September 1982 in Oldham) is an English actor and former police officer with Greater Manchester Police known for his role as Mick Cooper in the World War II film Enemy Lines, alongside Ed Westwick and John Hannah. He played Detective Constable Will Gibbons in the ITV drama Prey as well as Billy Parker in Hollyoaks and recurring roles in Doctors, Emmerdale and Casualty. He was the second actor to play Billy Parker in Hollyoaks.

Along with Danny Miler, he co-founded the children's bereavement charity Once Upon a Smile in 2011.

Filmography

References

External links
Once Upon a Smile
Prey at IMDb

1982 births
Living people
English male television actors